Indestructible is the sixth studio album by the American punk rock band Rancid. It was produced by Brett Gurewitz (Bad Religion) and released by Hellcat Records with distribution through Warner Bros. Records on August 19, 2003. Despite critical acclaim, the band was criticized by some of its fans for Indestructible'''s "poppier" sound on some of its tracks. It debuted at number 15 on the charts, selling 51,000 copies in its first week. It was Rancid's highest debut at the time, which was surpassed six years later with their 2009 album, Let the Dominoes Fall. Indestructible marks the last recording by drummer Brett Reed, who left the band in 2006 and was replaced by current drummer Branden Steineckert (formerly of The Used). Additionally, it is the only album that features songwriting contributions from Reed.

Writing and production

Production of the album began with following a US tour with NOFX in April and concluded in November 2002. Indestructible was described as the band's most personal album, covering personal issues including Tim Armstrong's divorce from ex-wife Brody Dalle on songs such as "Fall Back Down", "Ghost Band" and "Tropical London". The album's final track, "Otherside", was written by Lars Frederiksen and dedicated to his brother Robert, who died in 2001. The album was also dedicated two of band's mentors and influences: Joe Strummer and Joey Ramone, who both died during the making of the album. Strummer is mentioned in the album's title track.

Post production of the album consisted of cutting the record down from 25 tracks to 19 tracks. The six tracks left off of the final album were Killing Zone, Stranded, Trouble, Road To Hell, Warfare, and Squatter House. Killing Zone and Stranded were used as b-sides and bonus tracks for the record. Trouble was reworked and released as a single on Pink's third album Try This. That version of the song won Tim Armstrong and Pink a Grammy. Road to Hell was re-recorded and a Japanese bonus track on the 2nd Lars Frederiksen And The Bastards album Viking. Warfare and Squatter House remain unreleased.

Release
On June 6, 2003, the album's track listing was posted online. From June to August 2003, the group went on the 2003 edition of Warped Tour. On July 24, "Indestructible", "Back Against the Wall", and "Red Hot Moon" were posted on the band's website. "Fall Back Down" was released to radio on July 22, 2003. A music video for the song was posted on Yahoo! Launch on August 4, 2003.

The album was delayed a number of times before its official release. It was first scheduled for release in summer/fall 2002 beforing being delayed to early 2003, mid, and finally August 19, 2003. Chief among the reasons for the album's delay were band members' other commitments. Singer/guitarist Tim Armstrong released an album with his then-new side project Transplants and second guitarist Lars Frederiksen released an album with Lars Frederiksen and the Bastards. Warner Bros. Records released the CD version while LP was released by Epitaph. In August and September, the band toured Europe, a few shows of which were as part of the Reconstruction Festival. On September 30, they appeared on Late Night with Conan O'Brien. They then embarked on a headlining US tour in November, with Tiger Army; Nekromantix, the Frisk, and Roger Miret and the Disasters appeared on select dates. In February 2003, Rancid toured across Japan. "Red Hot Moon" was released to radio on October 28, 2003; a music video for the song was released to days later, and was filmed at CBGBs in New York City. In December, the band went on the Hellcat Tour with Tiger Army and F-Minus. Tim Shaw of Ensign sang Skinhead Rob's section of "Red Hot Moon" during the tour. Later in the month, the band performed at the KROQ Almost Acoustic Christmas festival. "Tropical London" was released to radio on April 27, 2004.

Following the release of the album, the group went on hiatus while each of the members toured and recorded albums with other bands.

Reception

Prior to the album's release the band signed a special distribution deal with Warner Bros. records which was met with major backlash from many of the band's fans for abandoning their independent roots. To ease tension among the fans, the album was released with no mention of Warner Bros. on the album packaging. According to a label spokesman "It's a unique deal that doesn't play by the traditional record biz rules. It's Rancid putting out an album on Hellcat, with the possibility of additional support from [Warner Bros.]." In a statement, Lars Frederiksen discussed the Warner Bros. deal by saying "We have absolutely no complaints with Hellcat. Yes, we are considering additional support that Warner Bros. might be able to provide, but whatever happens, we're sticking with Brett Gurewitz. All I care about and all I have is my music, my bandmates and my band. We are going to do whatever we need to do to survive."

The album was with mostly positive critical reviews, reaching #15 on the charts and making it the band's biggest debut at the time. However, some fans criticized the album for its stylistic departure from earlier work, claiming that a major label had influenced the band's music to appeal to mainstream listeners (despite the album being written prior to the band's agreement with the label). Still others felt the album to be a mixture of ...And Out Come the Wolves and Life Won't Wait. The album's first single "Fall Back Down", a song written about Armstrong's divorce and reliance on his close friends, was also met with some backlash from fans for featuring members of Good Charlotte and Kelly Osbourne in its music video.

Brody Dalle has never listened to the album. "I had no desire to listen to [Tim's] record [at the time it came out]. Someone said there was a song called "Tropic London", which was maybe about me and Melbourne. I still haven't heard it."

Track listing

Album notes
 "Out of Control" was used for the video game Need For Speed: Underground.
 "Fall Back Down", was used on Tony Hawk's Underground 2 soundtrack, the EA Sports video game NASCAR Thunder 2004 and the Forza Horizon 3 soundtrack.
 The average score on Metacritic for the album was a positive 84%
 The LP bonus track "Killing Zone" is also available on the Give 'Em the Boot IV compilation.
 "Killing Zone" was also the last song Rancid recorded with Brett Reed in the band.
 "Fall Back Down" was also featured in the movie Agent Cody Banks 2''

Personnel
 Tim Armstrong - vocals, guitar, mixing
 Lars Frederiksen - vocals, guitar, cover photo
 Matt Freeman - vocals, bass
 Brett Reed - drums
 Brett Gurewitz - vocals, producer, engineer, mixing
 Rob Aston - vocals
 Siedah Garrett - vocals
 Vic Ruggiero - keyboards
 Luis Conte - percussion
 Joe Barresi - mixing
 Douglas Boehm - mixing
 Dave Carlock - editing
 Rob Schnapf - mixing
 Seth McLain - editing
 Edmond Monsef - editing
 Nick Raskulinecz - engineer, editing
 Andrew Alekel - engineer
 John "Silas" Cranfield - assistant engineer
 Pete Martinez - assistant engineer
 Citris Reynolos - assistant engineer
 Kevin Dran - assistant
 Nick Pritchard - design

Charts

References

Rancid (band) albums
2003 albums
Hellcat Records albums
Albums recorded at Sound City Studios